Sultan Khel is a village and union council of Mianwali District in the Punjab province of Pakistan. It is located in Isakhel Tehsil.

References

Union councils of Mianwali District